Lepidochrysops kilimanjarensis is a butterfly in the family Lycaenidae. It is found on Mount Kilimanjaro in Tanzania.

References

Butterflies described in 1909
Lepidochrysops
Endemic fauna of Tanzania
Butterflies of Africa